R v Jordan (1956) 40 Cr App R 152 was an English criminal law case that has been distinguished by two later key cases of equal precedent rank for its ruling that some situations of medical negligence following a wounding are those of breaking the chain of causation (across much of Europe termed a novus actus interveniens), capable of absolving a person who has inflicted bodily harm of guilt for an offence of the severity resulting from a consequent decline in bodily condition, in particular, homicide. The facts were ones whereby a wound was should to be almost certain, with no treatment, to heal itself. The medical attempt to facilitate recovery from the wound resulted in a non-prosecutable death as it was shown to have been negligent and principally an antibiotic error though far from unknown and well-intentioned. The appropriate charge(s) would be ones relating to wounding or disorder of the defendant, rather than homicide which could not have been said to have been caused by the defendant in any meaningful way.

Facts
The appellant and three others – all serving members of the United States Airforce – became involved in a disturbance at a café in Hull, with the appellant stabbing a man, Beaumont, then admitted to hospital. 

The defence team conceded their client stabbed Beaumont; they then uncovered medical evidence not available at trial and appealed on the grounds that the medical treatment the victim had received was so negligent as to break the appellant's liability.

Judgment
Ordinarily, the circumstances and medical treatment following serious bodily harm are not relevant in establishing a defendant's liability for his acts. Where the original wound or injury caused by the defendant is still an 'operating cause' of death, negligent medical treatment will not constitute a novus actus interveniens.

However, in the judgment of Hallett J, acting as a judge of the Court of Appeal, it was conceded that the death of the victim was not "consequent upon the wound inflicted." Hallett summed up the fresh medical evidence as such:

The Court took the view that based on these facts – and that the original stab wound had healed – a reasonable jury would not be satisfied that the defendant's acts had been the material cause of the victim's death. As such, the conviction was quashed.

The defendant was not liable because the original wound's healing was quite well-advanced and set to heal with negligible risk of death, then further medical treatment was 'palpably wrong' thus breaking the link between the defendant's act and the victim's death.

See also
 R v Smith (Thomas Joseph)
 R v Cheshire

Notes and references
Footnotes

Citations

J
1956 in case law
1956 in British law
Court of Appeal (England and Wales) cases